"So Excited" is a song by American rapper Fat Joe, released on August 2, 2017. The song was produced by his longtime producer Streetrunner and features Dre from Cool & Dre on the hook.

Composition
"So Excited" samples "Don't Look Any Further" by Dennis Edwards and Siedah Garrett, which was notably sampled on 2Pac's infamous diss record "Hit 'Em Up" and Junior M.A.F.I.A. and The Notorious B.I.G.'s "Gettin' Money (The Get Money Remix)."

Music video
The official music video was released August 11, 2017.

Charts

References

External links

2017 singles
2017 songs
Songs written by Fat Joe
Fat Joe songs
Empire Distribution singles
Songs written by Dre (record producer)